Inka Mach'ay (Quechua inka Inca, mach'ay cave, "Inca cave", Hispanicized spelling Incamachay, Inca Machay) is an archaeological site in Peru. It is situated in the Huancavelica Region, Tayacaja Province, Ñahuimpuquio District.

See also 
 Tampu Mach'ay
 Pirwayuq

References 

Archaeological sites in Peru
Archaeological sites in Huancavelica Region